Inside Las Vegas is a non-fiction book by Mario Puzo, one of only two non-fiction works by this author. It gives an in-depth behind the scenes look at the world of gambling in Las Vegas. It was published in 1977.

()

1977 non-fiction books
Non-fiction books about gambling
American non-fiction books
Books by Mario Puzo
Las Vegas Valley
Grosset & Dunlap books